The Fédération Internationale d'Escrime, commonly known by the acronym FIE, is the international governing body of Olympic fencing. Today, its head office is at the Maison du Sport International in Lausanne, Switzerland. The FIE is composed of 157 national federations, each of which is recognized by its country's Olympic Committee as the sole representative of Olympic-style fencing in that country.

Since its inception in 1913, there have been 14 presidents. The position of president of the federation is currently vacant, but was most recently occupied by Russian oligarch Alisher Usmanov (until 2022).

History

The Fédération Internationale d'Escrime is the heir of the  founded in France in 1882, which took part in the global movement of structuring sport. On this occasion the  organised one of the first international fencing events; French, Italian, Spanish, and Belgian fencers attended the competition. The third congress held in Brussels in 1905 voted the creation of an international fencing committee whose mission would be of fostering friendship amongst all fencers, establishing national rules, and supporting the organization of fencing competitions. The third congress also adopted the French rules as the basis for upcoming international competitions. New tensions appeared, this time between France and Italy, about the regulatory weapon grip. They led to the boycott by France of the fencing events of the 1912 Olympic Games. A new international congress was called together in Ghent, Belgium, in July 1913. The main matter was the adoption of international regulations for each of the three weapons. The French rules were adopted in épée and foil; the Hungarian rules were chosen for sabre. Frenchman René Lacroix also campaigned for the creation of an international fencing federation.

The Fédération Internationale d'Escrime was founded on November 29, 1913, in the conference rooms of the Automobile Club de France in Paris. The nine founding nations were Belgium, Bohemia (now the Czech Republic), France, Great Britain, Hungary, Italy, the Netherlands, and Norway. Albert Feyerick, president of the Federation of fencing clubs of Belgium, was elected as the first president. The FIE held its first congress on June 23, 1914, and accepted the adhesion of seven new countries: Austria, Denmark, Monaco, Romania, Russia, Switzerland, and the United States.

Russian oligarch Alisher Usmanov was elected president of the FIE in 2008 with 66 votes to 61 for incumbent president René Roch. He was re-elected in 2012 and 2016. In 2021, Usmanov was re-elected by acclamation to a fourth term, for which he was congratulated by Vladimir Putin. On 28 February 2022, in reaction to the Russian invasion of Ukraine, the European Union blacklisted Usmanov, imposing an EU-wide travel ban on him and freezing all of his assets. The EU stated: "He has been referred to as one of Vladimir Putin’s favourite oligarchs." Following the imposition of the sanctions on him, Usmanov announced on 1 March 2022, in an accusatory letter, that he was stepping down as FIE President.

In reaction to the 2022 Russian invasion of Ukraine, the FIE agreed with the European Fencing Confederation to ban Russian and Belarusian fencers, and reallocated competitions that were due to be held in Russia and Belarus. On 10 March 2023, the FIE became the first Olympic governing body to officially reinstate Russian and Belarusian athletes and officials, in time for the start of the qualification for the 2024 Summer Olympics.

Events
Competitions organized by the FIE include the senior World Championships and World Cup, the Junior World Championships and Junior World Cup, the Cadets World Championships and the Veterans World Championships. The FIE delegates to regional confederations the organization of the zone championships.

The FIE assists the International Olympic Committee in the organization of fencing events at the Summer Olympics. The number of events is a matter of contention between the FIE and the CIO since the introduction of women's sabre at the 1999 World Championships: since then, the World Championships feature twelve events–an individual and a team weapon for each of the three weapons, for men and for women. However, the CIO refuses to increase the number of Olympic medals allocated to fencing. After much dithering, the FIE decided to organize all six individual events, but only four team events decided on a rotational basis. The two team events excluded from the Olympic programme, one for men and one for women, compete instead in World championships.

People

Presidents of the FIE

A list of FIE presidents from 1913 to the present:
 
 1913–1921: Albert Feyerick
 1921–1924: André Maginot
 1925–1928: George van Rossem
 1929–1932: Eugène Empeyta
 1933–1948: Paul Anspach
 1949–1952: Jacques Coutrot
 1953–1956: Giuseppe Mazzini
 1957–1960: Pierre Ferri
 1961–1964: Miguel de Capriles
 1965–1980: Pierre Ferri
 1981–1984: Giancarlo Brusati
 1984–1992: Rolland Boitelle
 1993–2008: René Roch
 2008–2022: Alisher Usmanov

Athletes

National federations

As of 2019, the FIE recognizes 157 affiliated national federations.
{|  class="wikitable" style="margin:1em auto;"
|- style="background:#cdc9c9;"
! style="width:19%;" | Africa (CAE)
 America (CPE)
! style="width:16%;" | Asia (FCA)
Europe (CEE)
! style="width:16%;" | Oceania (OFC)
|-
|  style="text-align:left; vertical-align:top;" |
 Algeria
 Angola
 Benin 
 Botswana 
 Burkina Faso 
 Cameroon 
 Cape Verde 
 Côte d'Ivoire 
 Democratic Republic of the Congo 
 Egypt 
 Equatorial Guinea 
 Gabon 
 Ghana 
 Guinea 
 Kenya 
 Libya 
 Madagascar 
 Mali 
 Morocco 
 Mauritania 
 Mauritius 
 Namibia 
 Niger 
 Nigeria 
 Republic of the Congo 
 Rwanda  
 Senegal 
 Sierra Leone 
 Somalia 
 South Africa 
 Togo 
 Tunisia 
 Uganda
|  style="text-align:left; vertical-align:top;" | 
 Antigua and Barbuda 
 Argentina 
 Aruba 
 Bahamas 
 Barbados 
 Belize 
 Bermuda 
 Bolivia 
 Brazil 
 Canada
 Chile
 Colombia 
 Costa Rica 
 Cuba 
 Dominica 
 Dominican Republic 
 Ecuador 
 El Salvador 
 Guatemala 
 Guyana 
 Haiti 
 Honduras 
 Jamaica 
 Mexico 
 Nicaragua 
 Panama 
 Paraguay 
 Peru 
 Puerto Rico 
 United States 
 United States Virgin Islands 
 Uruguay 
 Venezuela
|  style="text-align:left; vertical-align:top;" | 
 Afghanistan 
 Bangladesh 
 Bahrain 
 Brunei 
 Cambodia 
 Chinese Taipei 
 Hong Kong 
 India 
 Indonesia 
 Iran 
 Iraq 
 Japan 
 Jordan 
 Kazakhstan 
 Kyrgyzstan 
 Kuwait 
 Lebanon 
 Macao 
 Myanmar 
 Malaysia 
 Mongolia 
 Nepal 
 North Korea 
 Oman 
 Pakistan 
 Palestinian Territory 
 People's Republic of China 
 Philippines 
 Qatar 
 Saudi Arabia 
 Singapore 
 South Korea 
 Sri Lanka 
 Syria 
 Thailand 
 Tajikistan 
 Turkmenistan 
 United Arab Emirates 
 Uzbekistan 
 Vietnam 
 Yemen
|  style="text-align:left; vertical-align:top;" | 
 Albania 
 Armenia 
 Austria 
 Azerbaijan 
 Belgium 
 Belarus 
 Bulgaria 
 Croatia 
 Cyprus 
 Czech Republic 
 Denmark 
 Estonia 
 Finland 
 France 
 Georgia 
 Germany 
 Great Britain 
 Greece 
 Hungary 
 Ireland
 Iceland 
 Israel 
 Italy 
 Latvia 
 Lithuania 
 Luxembourg 
 Malta 
 Republic of Moldova 
 Monaco 
 North Macedonia 
 Norway 
 Netherlands 
 Poland 
 Portugal 
 Romania 
 Russia 
 San Marino 
 Serbia 
 Slovakia 
 Slovenia 
 Spain 
 Sweden 
 Switzerland 
 Turkey 
 Ukraine
|  style="text-align:left; vertical-align:top;" | 
 American Samoa 
 Australia 
 Guam 
 New Zealand 
 Papua New Guinea 
 Samoa 
|}

Note: , the Netherlands Antilles is still listed as an FIE Member nation, and 146 member nations are listed on the FIE's membership page. However, after the country was dissolved, it lost its National Olympic Committee status in 2011. At the 2012 Olympics, athletes from the former Netherlands Antilles were eligible to participate as independent athletes under the Olympic flag (no fencers competed).

References

Sources

External links

 
 Olympics, FIE records
 History of fencing
 FIE calendar
 Results of FIE competitions
 FIE rules
 FIE Magazines
 FIE press releases

 
Fencing
Fen
Fen
Sports organizations established in 1913